Desmiphora canescens is a species of beetle in the family Cerambycidae. It was described by Henry Walter Bates in 1874. It is known from Colombia, Mexico, and Venezuela.

References

Desmiphora
Beetles described in 1874